Anand Swarup Shukla is an Indian politician and a member of 17th Legislative Assembly of Uttar Pradesh of India. He represents the Ballia Nagar constituency in Ballia district of Uttar Pradesh and was Minister of state for Parliamentary Affairs, Rural development, Overall Village Development in Uttar Pradesh Government. He lost U.P. state election 2022.  He is currently a member of the Bharatiya Janata Party.

Early life and education
Shukla was born 6 October 1979 in Ballia, Uttar Pradesh to his father Harihar Nath Shuklaji. He has completed M.Sc. in Mathematics, M.A. in Political science and B.Ed. He completed his schooling from Nagaji Saraswati Vidya Mandir Senior Secondary School, Maldepur Ballia.

Political career
Shukla has been MLA for one term. Since 2017, he represents Ballia Nagar constituency as a member of Bhartiya Janata Party. In 2017 Uttar Pradesh Legislative Assembly election, he defeated Samajwadi Party candidate Laxman by a margin of 40,011 votes. He has been appointed Minister of state in a Yogi Adityanath cabinet on 21 August 2019.

In March 2021, Shukla called for the banning of the Burka in India.

Posts held

References

Uttar Pradesh MLAs 2017–2022
Bharatiya Janata Party politicians from Uttar Pradesh
Living people
People from Ballia district
1979 births